Cozola is a genus of tussock moths in the family Erebidae. The genus was erected by Francis Walker in 1865.

Species
The following species are included in the genus:
Cozola acroptera Collenette, 1947
Cozola ateralbus Rothschild, 1915
Cozola austriaca Semper, 1899
Cozola collenettei Nieuwenhuis, 1947
Cozola defecta Strand, 1923
Cozola dolichoptera Collenette, 1947
Cozola geometrica Semper, 1899
Cozola hapala Collenette, 1932
Cozola leucospila Walker, 1865
Cozola leucospiloides Strand, 1918
Cozola menadoensis Collenette, 1933
Cozola paloe Collenette, 1947
Cozola parentheta Collenette, 1947
Cozola submarginata Walker, 1865
Cozola subrana Moore, 1859
Cozola xanthopera Hampson, 1897

References

Lymantriinae
Noctuoidea genera